The Mercedes-Benz Vario Research Car was a concept study by then Daimler-Benz unveiled at the 1995 Geneva Motor Show. The goal was to show off control, design, and comfort innovations in passenger cars.

Innovations

Interchangeable bodies: sedan, station wagon, convertible, and pickup on the same chassis, conversion achieved within 15 minutes.
Light and sturdy bodies of carbon-fibre reinforced plastic. (CFRP)
Drive-by-wire technology, in which the steering and the brakes, for example, are activated electrically with no mechanical steering or braking.
Active Body Control (ABC). Production launch in the Mercedes-Benz C215.
Colour display (series launch in the Mercedes-Benz S-Class (W220).
Central rotary control to operate electronic functions. Production launch in the Mercedes-Benz S-Class (W221).

External links 

 Image of concept car

Vario Research Car